Darién National Park is a World Heritage Site in Panama. It is about 325 kilometers from Panama City, and is the most extensive of all national parks of Panama and is one of the most important world heritage sites in Central America.

The Darién National Park is a natural bridge spanning North and South America.

In 1972 an area of  became part of the Alto Darién Protection Forest. In 1980 the area was declared a National Park. In 1983 an area of  became a UNESCO biosphere reserve.

It is located in southernmost Panama in Darién province and its southern boundary extends along 90% of the Panama-Colombian border. It lies between the Serranía del Darién range, which parallels the Caribbean Sea 16 km to the northeast, and the Pacific Ocean coast.  It is adjacent to the Los Katíos National Park in Colombia.

Habitat
The Darien National Park has myriad habitats, ranging from rocky coastlines to sandy beaches to mangroves. The park also has expansive swamps and large areas of tropical forests.

Wildlife
Its most common species include macaw, parrot, and tapirs. The harpy eagle also calls this national park home. It is noted for its incredible genetic value.   The park is home to regional endemic species.

Indigenous inhabitants
The park is one of the few examples remaining in the world of a protected area inhabited by humans. To this day two Native tribes dwell in the park.

Visitors usually fly into El Real, the closest town to the park.

Visiting the park
Due to its extreme isolation, the Darién National Park is not very accessible. There are, however, two places where the park is often visited. Santa Cruz de Cana (more simply known as Cana) is one of them. Set in the middle of the park near the eastern slope of Cerro Pirre, Cana is one of Panama's most incredible outdoor areas. It has been called one of the world's ten greatest bird watching spots. There are several trails and a ranger station there.

The second point of access is Pirre Station. This is an ANAM ranger station set on the opposite side of Cerro Pirre. This area has primary forests and an abundance of wildlife, including several types of monkeys, sloths, and many bird species. There are several trails leading away from the ranger station that can be hiked. Travelers can stay in a basic dormitory at the ranger station.

The park is also notable for the Darién Gap, the only break in the Pan-American Highway on its intercontinental path from Argentina to Alaska.

References

National parks of Panama
Darién Province
Biosphere reserves of Panama
World Heritage Sites in Panama
Chocó–Darién moist forests